Millicent Carey Burgess (born 1923) is a Canadian educator. She may have been the first black teacher for the Toronto District School Board.

Biography
The daughter of James and Doris Carey, she worked as a substitute teacher for several years after completing high school. She began studying at Hamilton Teachers' College in Canada in 1950 after receiving a scholarship from the Bermuda government and completed the last two years of her studies at Toronto Teachers' College.

Burgess then returned to Bermuda and taught for three years. She married Edward Leroy Burgess there in 1954; the couple moved to Canada the following year. She worked as a clerk for Blue Cross in Toronto for one year and then began looking for a teaching position. Burgess was an elementary schoolteacher. During this time, she earned a BA from the University of Toronto by attending night classes.

She retired in 1989.

Other roles
1958-: member of the Canadian Negro Women's Association (CANEWA), later the Congress of Black Women of Canada
1957-1989: Consultant with the Toronto Board of Education.

Prizes
2012: Recipient of the Reverend Addie Aylestock Award from the Ontario Black History Society

References 

1923 births
Living people
Bermudian emigrants to Canada
Black Canadian women
Canadian schoolteachers
University of Toronto alumni